In Unix-like operating systems, true and false are commands whose only function is to always return with a predetermined exit status. Programmers and scripts often use the exit status of a command to assess success (exit status zero) or failure (non-zero) of the command. The true and false commands represent the logical values of command success, because true returns 0, and false returns 1.

Usage
The commands are usually employed in conditional statements and loops of shell scripts. For example, the following shell script repeats the echo hello loop until interrupted:

while true
do
  echo hello
done

The commands can be used to ignore the success or failure of a sequence of other commands, as in the example:
make … && false
(Although , if available, may be more fitting for this purpose, as it prints a notification before terminating the session.)

The programs take no "actual" parameters; in the GNU version, the standard parameter --help displays a usage summary and --version displays the program version.

Null command
The true command is sometimes substituted with the very similar null command, written as a single colon. The null command is built into the shell, and may therefore be more efficient if true is an external program (true is usually a shell built in function). We can rewrite the upper example using : instead of true:

while :
do
  echo hello
done

The null command may take parameters, which are ignored. It is also used as a no-op dummy command for side-effects such as assigning default values to shell variables through the ${parameter:=word} parameter expansion form. For example, from bashbug, the bug-reporting script for Bash:

 : ${TMPDIR:=/tmp}
 : ${EDITOR=$DEFEDITOR}
 : ${USER=${LOGNAME-`whoami`}}

See also
List of Unix commands
Two-valued logic
IEFBR14

Notes

References

External links

Manual pages
true(1): Do nothing, successfully – GNU Coreutils reference
false(1): Do nothing, unsuccessfully – GNU Coreutils reference
true(1): Return true value – FreeBSD manual page
false(1): Return false value – FreeBSD manual page

Standard Unix programs
Unix SUS2008 utilities
IBM i Qshell commands